Hoseynabad (also Romanized as Ḩoseynābād; also known as Hosain Abad Hoomeh and Ḩoseynābād-e Ḩūmeh) is a village in Band-e Amir Rural District, Zarqan District, Shiraz County, Fars Province, Iran. At the 2006 census, its population was 539, in 140 families.

References 

Populated places in Zarqan County